Mohammed Islam is an American professor of Engineering and Computer Science at University of Michigan and an Elected Fellow of the IEEE and Optical Society.

References

Year of birth missing (living people)
Living people
Fellow Members of the IEEE
University of Michigan faculty
21st-century American engineers
Place of birth missing (living people)